"Drill, Ye Tarriers, Drill" is an American folk song first published in 1888 and attributed to Thomas Casey (words) and later Charles Connolly (music). The song is a work song, and makes references to the construction of the American railroads in the mid-19th century. The title refers to Irish workers, drilling holes in rock to blast out railroad tunnels. It may mean either to tarry as in delay, or to terrier dogs which dig their quarry out of the ground, or from the French word for an auger, tarière. The song has been recorded by The Chad Mitchell Trio, The Weavers and Makem and Clancy, among many others.

Lyrics 
One version runs:

Every morning at seven o'clock
There's twenty tarriers a workin at the rock
The boss comes along and he says, "Keep still
And come down heavy on the cast iron drill."

Chorus:
So drill, ye tarriers, drill
And drill, ye tarriers, drill
Oh it's work all day for the sugar in your tay [i.e. tea]
Down beyond the railway
So drill, ye tarriers, drill.

Our new foreman is Dan McCann
I'll tell you sure, He was a blamed mean man
Last week a premature blast went off
And a mile in the air went big Jim Goff.
[Chorus]

Next time payday comes around
Jim Goff was short one buck he found
"What for?" asked he, then this reply
"You were docked for the time you were up in the sky."
[Chorus]

A verse sung by The Easy Riders circa 1956 runs:
The boss was a fine man down to the ground
And he married a lady six foot round
She baked good bread and she baked it well
But she baked that bread just as hard as hell

See also
The Tarriers
List of train songs

References

External links
Drill Ye Tarriers Drill (lyrics and embedded MIDI tune)
Traditional Ballad Index, California State University at Fresno

American folk songs
Songs about trains
Songs about labor
Songs about occupations
1888 songs
Songwriter unknown